Der Havelkaiser is a German television series.

See also
List of German television series

External links
 

1994 German television series debuts
2000 German television series endings
German-language television shows
Television shows set in Berlin
Das Erste original programming